Proprioseiopsis jugortus is a species of mite in the family Phytoseiidae. It is found in Europe.

References

jugortus
Articles created by Qbugbot
Animals described in 1966